OSI, acronym for Officine Stampaggi Industriali (literally "Industrial Stampings Workshops") was a coachbuilding company founded in 1960 in Turin by former Ghia president Luigi Segre (1919–63) and Arrigo Olivetti (1889–1977) from the Fergat company, a manufacturer of automotive components. OSI was intended to be an independent design branch of Ghia's, focussing on niche efforts.

The short lived company made some custom built cars based on Alfa Romeo, Fiat and Ford models. One of their first contracts was to build the bodyshells of the 1960 Innocenti 950 Spider, designed by a young Tom Tjaarda at Ghia's behest. Probably its best known model outside Italy was the Ford 20M TS Coupé based on the German Ford Taunus 20M. The car was designed by Sergio Sartorelli, better known as the designer of the Type 3 based Volkswagen Karmann Ghia Type 34. Approximately 2,200 of the Ford 20M based coupés were produced, of which approximately 200 were thought to have survived through till 2010.

The company also built the Ford Anglia Torino designed by Giovanni Michelotti: 10,007 examples of this model were sold in Italy.

Segre died after complications following appendicitis (variously reported as an infection during recovery after successful removal of kidney stones) in 1963, leaving the rising company without its personal link to Ghia and Ford. He was replaced by Giacomo Bianco of Fergat, but Bianco was unable to keep the company afloat as contracts began to dry up. In 1966 2,000 employees had to be laid off, and OSI car production ended in December 1967. Bianco was fired and Sartorelli was charged with winding down operations, incorporating the OSI design office with that of Fiat's in May 1968. The company remained active as a producer of steel pressings and industrial equipment.

References

External links
1966 O.S.I. SCARABEO on conceptcars.it

Coachbuilders of Italy
Vehicle manufacturing companies established in 1960
Manufacturing companies based in Turin
Italian companies established in 1960
Vehicle manufacturing companies disestablished in 1967
1967 disestablishments in Italy